The SAAB RB05 (abbreviation of Swedish: Robot 05, "Missile 05"), contemporarily named AT 3 internally, was a short-range air-to-surface missile with limited air-to-air capability that was developed in the 1960s by the Swedish company Saab-Scania, Missiles and Electronics for the Swedish Air Force.

History 
The RB 05 was developed as a ground attack missile for the AJ 37 Viggen in 1967, and was issued for operative use in 1972.

Use 
The missile would usually be launched after a high-speed attack run on very low altitude and climb to 400 m for launch. The supersonic speed was deemed necessary to reduce the threat of surface-to-air missiles. Since RB 05 was roll-stabilized, the aircraft did not need to be aimed straight at the target when launching, and would immediately descend again.

Tracking the flares on the missile, the pilot would then guide the missile optically (the missile's engine was smokeless as to not obscure the view) with a joystick towards the target. Guidance commands were transmitted to the missile via a jam-proof radio transmission link.

Operators 

 
 Swedish Air Force : operated the RB 05 on the AJ, AJSF and AJS 37 Viggen strike fighters and The Sk 60B and C light attackers.

Variants 
 RB 05 A : initial variant with radio guidance, aimed optically using a tracer.
 RB 05 B : prototyped TV-guided variant. Tested in the early 1970s but the design was scrapped in favour of adopting the AGM-65 Maverick (RB 75) for economic reasons.
 RB 05 C : proposed command/IR guided version. During use the pilot would aim the aircraft on to the target. In the aircraft there would be an IR sensor that measured in the missile and gave data to the aircraft computer, which calculated control signals for the robot. Not much is known. Cancelled.

Similar missiles 
 AGM-12 Bullpup
 AS-20
 Kh-23

References

Notes

External links 
 In Swedish
 Info on the RB 05 with the AJ 37 Viggen

Guided missiles of Sweden
Military equipment introduced in the 1970s